The Land Settlement Association was a UK Government scheme set up in 1934, with help from the charities the Plunkett Foundation and the Carnegie Trust, to re-settle unemployed workers from depressed industrial areas, particularly from North-East England and Wales. Between 1934 and 1939 1,100 small-holdings were established within 20 settlements. A further five settlements of "Cottage Homesteads" of about half an acre were established from 1937 for unemployed men, who could continue to claim assistance.

Small-holdings were grouped in communities which were expected to run agricultural production as cooperative market gardens, with materials bought and produce sold exclusively through the Association. Applicants were vetted and given agricultural training before being assigned a property.

The allocation of settlements to the unemployed was suspended at the outbreak of the Second World War through the necessity of increasing food production; favour was given to those already with horticultural skills. After the war the Association was incorporated within a County Council scheme for statutory provision of smallholdings designed as a first step for those going into agricultural production. The scheme was wound-up and all the properties privatised in 1983, by which time it was producing roughly 40% of English home grown salad crops. The residual assets of the scheme were constituted as the LSA Charitable Trust, for the benefit of former tenants and to promote horticultural education.

Settlements
Land Settlement Association small-holding settlements were situated at:
Abington, Cambridgeshire
Andover, Hampshire
Broadwath, Cumbria
Chawston, Bedfordshire
Crofton, Cumbria
Dalston, Cumbria
Duxbury, Lancashire
Elmesthorpe, Leicestershire
Fen Drayton, Cambridgeshire
Foxash, Essex
Fulney, Lincolnshire
Harrowby, Lincolnshire
Newbourne, Suffolk
Newent, Gloucestershire
Oxcroft, Derbyshire 
Potton, Bedfordshire,
Sidlesham, Sussex
Snaith, Yorkshire
Stannington, Northumberland
Yeldham, Essex
Land Settlement Association Cottage Homestead settlements were situated at:
Cosby, Leicestershire
Long Lawford, Warwickshire
Dunstable, Bedfordshire
Caversham, Berkshire
Elmesthorpe, Leicestershire

References

Organizations established in 1934
Land management in the United Kingdom
Rural community development
History of agriculture in England
Settlement schemes in Europe
Industrial history of England
Industrial history of Wales
History of agriculture in Wales
English coast and countryside
Welsh coast and countryside
1934 establishments in England
1934 establishments in Wales
1983 disestablishments in England
Privatisation in the United Kingdom
Programmes of the Government of the United Kingdom